The Double Event is a 1921 British silent comedy film directed by Kenelm Foss and starring Mary Odette, Roy Travers and Lionelle Howard. After her father, a country clergyman, loses large sums of money his daughter recoups his losses by becoming the partner of a bookie.

The film is based on the play The Double Event, which was adapted into a sound film The Double Event in 1934.

Cast
 Mary Odette as Dot Martingale  
 Roy Travers as Captain Dennison  
 Lionelle Howard as Charles Martingale  
 Tom Coventry as Angus McNeil  
 Roy Byford as James Bennington  
 Beatie Olna Travers as Laura Bennington  
 James McWilliams as Reverend Hubert Martingale  
 Louie Freear as Susannah 
 Sydney Wood as Dick Martingale  
 Julie Kean as Harriet Martingale

References

Bibliography
 Low, Rachael. History of the British Film, 1918-1929. George Allen & Unwin, 1971.

External links

1921 films
1920s sports comedy films
British silent feature films
British sports comedy films
British horse racing films
Films directed by Kenelm Foss
British films based on plays
Films set in England
British black-and-white films
1921 comedy films
1920s English-language films
1920s British films
Silent sports comedy films